Chester Otto Weger (born March 3, 1939) is an American man who was convicted in 1961 of the murder of one of three women found slain at Starved Rock State Park the previous year.  He was held at Pinckneyville Correctional Center and at one time was the longest serving inmate incarcerated by the State of Illinois as well as the third longest in state history before his release on February 21, 2020. On November 21, 2019, the Illinois Prisoner Review Board granted parole to Weger by a vote of 9–4. He was released on parole February 21, 2020.

Murders
In March 1960, three women, Frances Murphy (47), Mildred Lindquist (50), and Lillian Oetting (50), wives of prominent Chicago businessmen, took a four-day trip to Starved Rock State Park in LaSalle County, Illinois, along the banks of the Illinois River. They arrived from the Chicago suburb of Riverside, about 90 miles northeast of the park. On March 14, after checking into the Starved Rock Lodge, the three took an afternoon hike through St. Louis Canyon, but never returned. Their disappearances went unnoticed until March 16 when the husband of Frances Murphy phoned the lodge to inquire about his wife. Police organized a search of the park which led to the discovery of the women's bodies, bound with twine and partially disrobed, inside a cave in the canyon. All three suffered severe head trauma and a blood stained tree limb found nearby was determined to have been used to bludgeon them to death.

Weger, a dishwasher at the Starved Rock Lodge, was among those interviewed by Illinois State Police in the aftermath of the discovery. Several employees of the lodge told investigators that he showed to work the day after the women's disappearances with scratches on his face. Weger was questioned extensively in the weeks following the murders and was administered at least three lie detector tests, which he passed. However, investigators continued to pursue him owing to his past brushes with the law. He fit the description of an assailant who bound a teenage girl with twine and raped her at nearby Matthiessen State Park months earlier, and was later identified by the victim in a photo line-up. The twine used to bind the murder victims was the same as that found in the kitchen at the lodge, and he failed a lie detector test given to him in September. Based on this, investigators put him on nonstop surveillance.

On November 16, the LaSalle County state's attorney ordered Weger arrested and brought in for further questioning. After lengthy interrogation, he confessed to the murders the next day and led police in a reenactment at the crime scene. However, just days later, Weger recanted his confession, claiming it was made under duress after being threatened by his interrogators. A grand jury returned indictments against Weger for all three murders, as well as the rape and robbery at Matthiessen State Park, however the state chose to only try him for the murder of Lillian Oetting.

Weger's trial began on February 13, 1961. His defense relied on the claim that investigators were relentless in extracting a confession from him, that he was told they would convict him on circumstantial evidence if he didn't and send him to the electric chair, accusations the investigators and other witnesses denied. He claimed he was getting a haircut during the time of the murders, and that the scratches seen on his face in the days after the murders were from shaving. Bloodstains found on Weger's leather jacket analyzed by the FBI were inconclusive as to whether they were human or animal.

On March 3, 1961, the jury returned a verdict of guilty and fixed a sentence of life imprisonment, rejecting the state's request to sentence him to death. Weger was formally sentenced on April 3, and began serving his sentence at Illinois State Penitentiary in Joliet. His attorney filed an appeal which made its way to the Illinois Supreme Court, however the verdict was affirmed in September 1962.

Parole
In prison, Weger repeatedly professed his innocence over the decades, but was consistently denied parole. On November 29, 2018, he fell one vote short of parole in a split vote of 7–7 before the Illinois Prisoner Review Board. One year later, on November 21, 2019, the same board voted 9–4 in granting his release after nearly 59 years in prison. He was released to a Chicago mission that aids parolees with rehabilitation. After a 90-day delay as the Illinois Attorney General sought an evaluation of Weger under the state’s Sexually Violent Persons Commitment Act, he was released February 21, 2020.

On August 1, 2022, Evidence from the Starved Rock murders went to the lab and one of them – a glove worn by victim Frances Murphy – bore a hair. It was a man’s hair and the lab retrieved DNA. It wasn’t Chester Weger’s.

Weger attorney Andy Hale said Friday, February 24, 2023 that they still don’t know whose hair it was. An attempt to crosscheck it against a DNA databank came up empty.

In popular culture
On December 14, 2021, HBO Max released a three-part docuseries called The Murders of Starved Rock. The series focuses on the investigation into the murders, Weger's incarceration, and the idea Weger could ultimately be innocent. The series was produced by Mark Wahlberg, directed by Jody McVeigh-Schultz, and focuses on David Raccuglia, son of Anthony Raccuglia, the prosecuting officer on Weger's case.

See also
List of longest prison sentences served
William Heirens – served 65 years in Illinois detention
Richard Honeck – served 64 years in Illinois detention

References

Further reading

External links
American Hauntings: The Starved Rock Murders – Illinois History and Horror

1939 births
1960 murders in the United States
20th-century American criminals
American male criminals
American people convicted of murder
American prisoners sentenced to life imprisonment
Criminals from Illinois
Living people
People convicted of murder by Illinois
People paroled from life sentence
Prisoners sentenced to life imprisonment by Illinois
Violence against women in the United States